The Palau dels Esports de Barcelona (Barcelona Sports Palace) is a multi-purpose indoor arena in Barcelona, Catalonia, Spain. It is on Lleida Street on the slopes of Montjuïc, a hill to the south east of the city centre.

The arena is able to host competitions of any indoor sport. In 2000 it was adapted to better accommodate theatre and musical shows and given a new name: Barcelona Teatre Musical. The seating capacity was reduced from 8,000 to 3,500, but comfort and the acoustic quality were enhanced.

History
Inaugurated in 1955 for the Mediterranean Games, it was designed by the architect Josep Soteras.

It was the only indoor arena of its type in Barcelona until 1971 when FC Barcelona inaugurated the Palau Blaugrana. Even after this, the Palau dels Esports continued to be the only indoor arena in public hands: for this reason it continued to host the main sporting, social, cultural and musical events that took place in the city.

During the 1980s it was the home of the RCD Espanyol basketball team, which for several seasons competed in the ACB.

It was remodelled in 1986 by the architect Francesc Labastida for the group E games of the World Basketball Championship of 1986.

At the beginning of the 1990s activity in the arena began to diminish. The basketball team disappeared and in 1990 the Palau Sant Jordi was inaugurated, attracting many of the top events from that date on.

The venue hosted rhythmic gymnastics and the preliminary phase of the volleyball for the 1992 Summer Olympics. This proved to be its sporting swansong, however, and from the mid-1990s it concentrated on hosting drama, music and comedy.

Notable sporting events
1955: Mediterranean Games
1969: European champions cup final in which CSKA Moscow defeated Real Madrid 103-99 after two overtime periods in front of a 9,000 sellout crowd
1973: European Basketball Championship Final phase
1986: World Basketball Championship semi final round, Group E
1992: 1992 Summer Olympics

References

External links

Info from bcn.es
Info from agendabcn.com 
Location on Google Maps

Sports venues completed in 1955
Indoor arenas in Catalonia
Venues of the 1992 Summer Olympics
Olympic gymnastics venues
Olympic volleyball venues
Defunct basketball venues
Sports venues in Barcelona
Volleyball venues in Spain
Basketball venues in Spain
Boxing venues in Spain
Taekwondo venues
1955 establishments in Spain